Muslim Uddin is a Bangladeshi politician and the former Member of Bangladesh Parliament of Rajbari-2.

Career
Uddin was elected to parliament from Rajbari-2 as a Combined opposition candidate in 1988.

References

Living people
4th Jatiya Sangsad members
Year of birth missing (living people)